Office of the Registrar General, Birth & Death Registration is a Bangladesh government regulatory agency under the Ministry of Local Government, Rural Development and Co-operatives responsible for the registration of births and deaths in Bangladesh.

History
In 2001, the government of Bangladesh started Birth and Death Registration Project with support from UNICEF. The project was placed under the Local Government Division. The Birth and Death Registration Act 1873 and  Births, Deaths and Marriages Registration Act 1886 were repealed. A new  Birth and Death Registration Act was passed in 2004. The law allowed local government bodies and Bangladesh embassies abroad to register births and deaths. The Office of the Registrar General of Birth and Death was established in September 2013 to establish a permanent central database of birth and death records.

According to an estimate of the Office of the Registrar General, Birth & Death Registration 10 million children under the age of five do not have birth certificates and registrations.

Office of the Registrar General, Birth & Death Registration is having difficulties with online registration of birth certificates as of January 2021. The database has problems with recording the wrong gender on certificates and records according to a report by Dhaka Tribune.

Services
Birth Registration
 Application for birth registration
 Application status
 Verify birth registration
 Cancel more than one birth registration
 Birth and death registration complaint by online
 Real time data of birth
 Login
 E-Report
Death Registration
 Application of Death Registration
 Death application status
 Verify Death Registration

References

2013 establishments in Bangladesh
Organisations based in Dhaka
Government agencies of Bangladesh